Ōhaupō is a rural community in the Waipa District and Waikato region of New Zealand's North Island. It is located on State Highway 3, about halfway between Hamilton and Te Awamutu.

The Ōhaupō area and surrounding Ngāhinapōuri, Te Rore and Harapēpē area were military outposts during the Waikato War and a military fortification was built about one kilometre north of the township in April 1864. Other military fortifications had been built at nearby Ngāhinapōuri, Tuhikaramea and Te Rore four months earlier, in December 1863.

The earliest European settlers in Ōhaupō were Bohemian militiamen from the Puhoi settlement north of Auckland. As of 2015, many descendants of these militiamen still lived in the area.

In July 2020, the name of the locality was officially gazetted as Ōhaupō by the New Zealand Geographic Board.

The Ohaupo railway station was a train station on the North Island Main Trunk It included a ladies' waiting room, public vestibule, ticket lobby, stationmaster's office, an asphalt platform, goods shed and a 7-room stationmaster's house. In 1927 the station was handling almost 2,700 tons of fertiliser each year.

The Mystery Creek Events Centre east of the township hosts the Southern Hemisphere's largest agricultural event, Fieldays.

Demographics
The settlement is part of the larger Kaipaki statistical area.

Ōhaupō had a population of 603 at the 2018 New Zealand census, an increase of 84 people (16.2%) since the 2013 census, and an increase of 180 people (42.6%) since the 2006 census. There were 204 households, comprising 285 males and 324 females, giving a sex ratio of 0.88 males per female, with 126 people (20.9%) aged under 15 years, 87 (14.4%) aged 15 to 29, 252 (41.8%) aged 30 to 64, and 132 (21.9%) aged 65 or older.

Ethnicities were 90.5% European/Pākehā, 11.9% Māori, 1.5% Pacific peoples, 3.5% Asian, and 2.5% other ethnicities. People may identify with more than one ethnicity.

Although some people chose not to answer the census's question about religious affiliation, 57.2% had no religion, 30.3% were Christian, 1.0% were Hindu, 1.0% were Buddhist and 3.0% had other religions.

Of those at least 15 years old, 93 (19.5%) people had a bachelor's or higher degree, and 84 (17.6%) people had no formal qualifications. 81 people (17.0%) earned over $70,000 compared to 17.2% nationally. The employment status of those at least 15 was that 234 (49.1%) people were employed full-time, 63 (13.2%) were part-time, and 9 (1.9%) were unemployed.

Kaipaki statistical area

Kaipaki had a population of 1,581 at the 2018 New Zealand census, an increase of 246 people (18.4%) since the 2013 census, and an increase of 369 people (30.4%) since the 2006 census. There were 531 households, comprising 786 males and 795 females, giving a sex ratio of 0.99 males per female. The median age was 39.9 years (compared with 37.4 years nationally), with 342 people (21.6%) aged under 15 years, 231 (14.6%) aged 15 to 29, 750 (47.4%) aged 30 to 64, and 258 (16.3%) aged 65 or older.

Ethnicities were 91.7% European/Pākehā, 11.0% Māori, 0.9% Pacific peoples, 2.1% Asian, and 2.7% other ethnicities. People may identify with more than one ethnicity.

The percentage of people born overseas was 14.6, compared with 27.1% nationally.

Although some people chose not to answer the census's question about religious affiliation, 55.8% had no religion, 33.8% were Christian, 0.4% had Māori religious beliefs, 0.4% were Hindu, 0.2% were Muslim, 0.4% were Buddhist and 2.8% had other religions.

Of those at least 15 years old, 288 (23.2%) people had a bachelor's or higher degree, and 213 (17.2%) people had no formal qualifications. The median income was $39,800, compared with $31,800 nationally. 300 people (24.2%) earned over $70,000 compared to 17.2% nationally. The employment status of those at least 15 was that 684 (55.2%) people were employed full-time, 198 (16.0%) were part-time, and 24 (1.9%) were unemployed.

Education
The original school at Ōhaupō was built in 1870, and was the first school in the Waikato. It burned in 1915, and was replaced by the present building the following year.

The school started as Pukerimu School in 1876, and was moved to its current location in 1920.

References

External links 

 1865 map

Waipa District
Populated places in Waikato